Aweil Center County is an administrative area in Northern Bahr el Ghazal, South Sudan.

References

Counties of South Sudan
Northern Bahr el Ghazal